Great Britain competed at the 2019 European Games, in Minsk, Belarus from 21 to 30 June 2019. It won 6 gold medals, 9 silver medals and 8 bronze medals, totalling 23 medals and placing 9th on the medals table. When it had previously competed at the 2015 European Games in Baku, Azerbaijan, it won 47 medals, including 18 golds.

Before the Games
Team GB announced the athletes selected to represent Great Britain on the 21 May 2019 adding the selection of archers on the 24 May. With swimming, Great Britain's most successful sport in 2015, removed from the Games program, and with the decision not to take part ion the Athletics competition, the team chosen was significantly smaller than that which made the journey to Baku in 2015.

Medalists

|  style="text-align:left; width:78%; vertical-align:top;"|

| width="22%" align="left" valign="top" |

Archery

Men

Women

Mixed

Badminton

Boxing

Men

Women

Canoe sprint

Qualification legend: SF – Qualify to semifinal; FA – Qualify to medal final; FB – Qualify to non-medal final

Cycling

Road

Men

Women

Track

Pursuit

Individual sprint

Team sprint

Keirin

Qualification legend: Q – Qualify to second round; R – Qualify to repechage; FA – Qualify to medal final; FB Qualify to non-medal final

Bunch races

Omnium

Gymnastics

Acrobatic

Aerobic

Artistic

Men

Women

Trampoline

Judo

Men

Women

Karate

Kumite
Men

Shooting

Shotgun
Men

Women

Mixed

Table Tennis

Great Britain secured four quotas for the singles events and a position in the men's team event.

Wrestling

Women's freestyle

References

Nations at the 2019 European Games
European Games
2019